Stavropol is a city in southwestern Russia.

Stavropol may also refer to:
Stavropol Krai, the federal subject of Russia
Stavropol Soviet Republic,  short-lived division of the RSFSR in 1918, merged into the North Caucasian Soviet Republic
Stavropol Urban Okrug, a municipal formation which the city of krai significance of Stavropol in Stavropol Krai, Russia is incorporated as

See also
Stavropol-na-Volge, former name of Tolyatti, a city in Samara Oblast, Russia
Stauroupolis (disambiguation)
Stavropolovka, a village in the Chuy Province of Kyrgyzstan
Stavropolsky (disambiguation)